Mr. Trash Wheel, officially called the Inner Harbor Water Wheel, is a trash interceptor, a vessel that removes trash from the Jones Falls river as it empties into the Inner Harbor in Baltimore, Maryland. It is powered by water wheels and solar cells, and places trash from the harbor onto an onboard conveyor belt which routes it into dumpsters on the vessel. Mr. Trash Wheel was invented by John Kellett in 2008, who launched a pilot vessel at that time. A larger vessel was later developed; it replaced the pilot vessel and was launched in May 2014. The Mr. Trash Wheel vessel is part of the Waterfront Partnership of the City of Baltimore's "Healthy Harbor Plan."

Overview 

Mr. Trash Wheel is a moored vessel that removes trash from the mouth of the Jones Falls river at Baltimore's Inner Harbor. Rubbish from the streets of Baltimore is flushed into storm drains that empty into the Jones Falls river. The floating rubbish is then carried by the river to its outlet into the Inner Harbor, where it is captured by Mr. Trash Wheel. Mr. Trash Wheel is powered by the current from the river, and backup power is provided by solar panels when the current is sluggish. These power a conveyor belt. Mr. Trash Wheel removes floating debris using rotating forks that dip into and out of the water, and which then place the trash onto a conveyor belt which moves it into a dumpster. The water wheel can be controlled remotely on the Internet. Mr. Trash Wheel was constructed using $720,000 of public and private funding.

History 

Mr. Trash Wheel was invented by John Kellett, who developed the idea when observing trash in the harbor while passing Pier 6 on his walk to work. A pilot trash wheel was built and launched in the harbor by Kellett in 2008, and after this, Kellett built a larger machine that was launched in May 2014, which was able to pick up larger matter and held two dumpsters onboard. The use of two dumpsters allows the vessel to operate longer, without having to go back to shore to empty the single dumpster that was used on the initial pilot vessel.

On April 20, 2015, after the first significant rain storm of the season, Mr. Trash Wheel removed 19 tons of garbage from Baltimore's waterfront on that one day. The previous record for debris removal occurred on May 16, 2014, when the machine removed 11 tons of refuse on that day.

Mr. Trash Wheel is part of the Waterfront Partnership of Baltimore's "Healthy Harbor Plan", which has a goal to clean up the harbor to the point of making it swimmable by the year 2020. In 2015, the Waterfront Partnership of Baltimore began fundraising efforts to construct a second water wheel like Mr. Trash Wheel for use "off the Boston Street Pier Park" at the Harris Creek outfall in Canton, Baltimore. This second trash wheel has been given the nickname "Professor Trash Wheel."

Adam Lindquist, director of the Healthy Harbor Initiative, approached What Works Studio to leverage the popularity of a video of the device in 2015. What Works Studio Creative Strategist Justin Allen was immediately struck with the organic look of the device and suggested personifying it with googly eyes and giving it a name. Several names were suggested by the What Works Studio staff but Mr. Trash Wheel is the one that stuck. What Works Studio suggested using Twitter as its primary channel for communication where it started gaining a following under the management of multiple What Works Studio staff. At this point, the googly eyes only existed on images of the trash wheel. The first set of physical eyes, which Lindquist had handmade in his spare time, were removed after a brief period. In March 2016, Key Tech, a Baltimore-based technology solutions company donated a more robust pair of permanent eyes.

Additional instances 

Several additional trash wheels have been produced after the success of the original. Four patrol the Inner Harbor and there are plans for one on the West Coast and one in Central America. Working with Kellett, Panamanian officials were able to secure a grant to place a trash wheel in Panama City.

Like Mr. Trash Wheel, the others deployed so far have also been anthropomorphised:
 the Canton-based, female-gendered Professor Trash Wheel, visually distinguishable from the other instances due to her green googly eyes with lashes, was commissioned in December 2016;
 the gender-neutral Captain Trash Wheel without lashes but with brown irises in June 2018 at Brooklyn.
Another female-gendered wheel at the mouth of the Gwynns Falls named Gwynnda the Good Wheel of the West. Gwynnda has the same lashes as Professor Trash Wheel but with purple eyes. The largest of the four wheels, Gwynnda picks up more trash and debris than the other three wheels combined.

References

Further reading

External links 

 Mr. Trash Wheel
 Trash Wheel Project. Waterfront Partnership of Baltimore.
 Mr. Trash Wheel Twitter site
 Healthy Harbor Baltimore

Baltimore
Environment of Maryland
Service vessels of the United States
Waste management in the United States
Water pollution in the United States
2014 ships